The 1997 Men's NORCECA Volleyball Championship was the 15th edition of the tournament, played from 12 to 18 September in San Juan, Puerto Rico. The top  team qualified for the 1999 World Grand Champions Cup.

Competing nations
The following national teams have qualified:

Squads

Pool standing procedure
 Number of matches won
 Match points
 Points ratio
 Sets ratio
 Result of the last match between the tied teams

Match won 3–0: 5 match points for the winner, 0 match points for the loser
Match won 3–1: 4 match points for the winner, 1 match point for the loser
Match won 3–2: 3 match points for the winner, 2 match points for the loser

Preliminary round

Pool A

Pool B

Final round

7th place match

Quarterfinals

5th place match

Semifinals

Bronze medal match

Final

Final standing

References

External links

Men's NORCECA Volleyball Championship
NORCECA
1997 in Puerto Rican sports
International volleyball competitions hosted by Puerto Rico